Danh Monica (born 4 November 1986) is a Cambodian actress of the 2000s along with Keo Pich Pisey, Veth Rattana, Suos Sotheara, Chan Leakenna, Keo Nisa, Duch Sophea, and Sarai Sakana. She is the only Cambodian actress today who started acting as a child actor and who is skilled in classical Cambodian ballet.

Early life
Monica was born to Danh Vansa and Men Chan Nary, a performing arts teacher. As an only child from a wealthy family, Danh Monica was very fortunate to have all the resources she would need to be what she wanted, an actress. Because her mother was a performing arts teacher, Danh Monica was exposed to traditional arts. She entered the film industry and starred in her debut film, The Snake King's Child at the age of 14, in 2001.

Career
In the 2000s, Danh Monica, along with Keo Pich Pisey, starred in a large number of films including legendary films and modern films. The actress not only performs classical Cambodian ballet and operas, in which she learned from her mother from the ages of 7 through 16, but she also sing and perform in live concerts in countries such as France, China, the United States, and Canada. She has appeared in numerous music videos, karaokes, and live shows. Monica is also one of the first Cambodian TV soap opera stars. She starred in her first TV show/soap opera Klen Pka 3 Po which in English mean "The Arrogance of the Three Colored Flower in 2008.
Currently, Monica does not plan to have any children.

Filmography

References
https://web.archive.org/web/20100924105034/http://angkorthom.us/index.php?name=News&catid=3 Retrieved December 26, 2009.

External links
Photo Gallery
Khmer Magazines and Books

Living people
1986 births
Cambodian film actresses
21st-century Cambodian actresses
People from Phnom Penh